Max Borenstein (born June 20, 1981) is an American screenwriter. He is best known for his work on the MonsterVerse film series featuring classic Kaiju of Toho's Godzilla mythos, including writing Godzilla (2014) and Kong: Skull Island (2017), and contributing to the story of Godzilla: King of the Monsters (2019) and Godzilla vs. Kong (2021). In 2022, he co-created the sports drama series Winning Time: The Rise of the Lakers Dynasty on HBO.

Life and career
Borenstein wrote, edited, and directed the 2003 film Swordswallowers and Thin Men while a senior at Yale University. The film starred Peter Cellini, Zoe Kazan, Fran Kranz and Graham Norris, and featured Army Wives star Sally Pressman and Midnight's Children lead Satya Bhabha. The film won Best Feature and Best Screenplay at the New York Independent Film Festival and was named Best First Feature 2003 by Los Angeles Times critic Kevin Thomas.

Borenstein's 2008 screenplay What Is Life Worth?, based on Kenneth Feinberg's memoir of the same name, was included on The Black List, an annual list compiled by Hollywood executives of their favorite unproduced screenplays. On February 14, 2018, it was reported that he would produce his screenplay into film alongside Michael Sugar, Marc Butan, Sean Sorensen, and Bard Dorros, with director David Frankel helming the project. It was ultimately directed by Sara Colangelo under the title Worth. His 2009 screenplay Jimi, commissioned by Legendary Pictures and based on the life of guitarist Jimi Hendrix, was also included on The Black List. Borenstein has written and/or co-written additional projects for Legendary's MonsterVerse, including Godzilla, Kong: Skull Island, and Godzilla: King of the Monsters. He was hired to write Paladin for Walt Disney Pictures, and Mona for New Regency.

On May 4, 2017, HBO announced that Borenstein is one of four writers working on a potential pilot for a Game of Thrones spin-off. In addition to Borenstein, Carly Wray, Jane Goldman, and Brian Helgeland are also working on potential pilots. Borenstein has been working and communicating with George R. R. Martin, the author of A Song of Ice and Fire, the series of novels upon which the original series is based. Current Game of Thrones showrunners D. B. Weiss and David Benioff would also be executive producers for whichever project is picked up by HBO.

Filmography

Film 

Executive producer
 Ascension (2008)

Television

Short films

References

External links
 

American male screenwriters
Living people
Place of birth missing (living people)
1981 births